A truck is a vehicle for carrying goods and materials.
Truck or trucks may also refer to:

Entertainment

Film & televsion
 The Truck, a 1980 Bulgarian film
 Trucks (film), a 1997 TV film based on the Stephen King story
 Trucks!, a television program
 "Trucks" (short story), a 1973 short story by Stephen King

Literature
 Truck, a children's picture book by Donald Crews
 Trucks!, the title of a children's story from the Railway Series book The Little Old Engine by the Reverend Wilbert Awdry

Music
 Monster Truck (band), a 2000s Canadian rock band from Hamilton, Ontario.
 Truck (band), a Singaporean psychedelic rock trio
 Truck (Canadian band), a Canadian rock group active during the 1960s and 1970s. 
 Truck Festival, a British music festival
 Truck Records, a record label associated with the festival
 Truck (album), an album by Jett Rebel
 Trucks (band), a British pop-punk band
 Truck, a song by Hardy from his 2020 album A Rock

Objects
 Bogies, called "trucks" in North American railroading
 Skateboard truck, the axle assemblies of a skateboard
 Truck (rigging), a wooden ball, disk, or bun-shaped cap at the top of a mast
 Goods wagons, sometimes called "trucks" in British English

People
 Truck Hannah (1889–1982), Major League Baseball catcher
 Truck Parham (1911–2002), American jazz double-bassist
 Truck Robinson (born 1951), retired National Basketball Association power forward
 Fred Truck American artist
 Butch Trucks (1947–2017), American drummer and a founding member of The Allman Brothers Band
 Derek Trucks (born 1979), American guitarist, songwriter, founder of The Derek Trucks Band and member of The Allman Brothers Band; nephew of Butch Trucks
 Toni Trucks (born 1980), American actress
 Virgil Trucks (1917–2013), Major League Baseball pitcher and coach

Other uses 
 Trucks or trucco, a lawn game
 The Truck system, in which employees are paid with credit that can only be redeemed from the employers' goods or store

See also 
 Hand truck, also a sack truck in the United Kingdom, a form of wheeled dolly
 "Truckin'", a 1970 Grateful Dead song 
 Chuuk (disambiguation), several entities in Micronesia, also spelled Truk

Lists of people by nickname